The Church of the Immaculate Conception and Clergy House at 406–412 East 14th Street between First Avenue and Avenue A in the East Village neighborhood of Manhattan, New York City were built in 1894–1896 by Grace Church, one of the most prominent Episcopal churches in the city at the time. The buildings were a free chapel – meaning there was no pew rent – called Grace Chapel and a connected Grace Hospital, which could serve 16 senior citizens and 10 children, and was physically connected to the chapel by a bridge, so that patients could be wheeled to services.

They were designed by Barney and Chapman in French Gothic style. The firm was working at the same time on the Church of the Holy Trinity in Yorkville, which was also designed in the same style. Grace Chapel has stained-glass windows by Clayton & Bell and Henry Holiday. In 1943 both buildings were sold to the Roman Catholic Archdiocese of New York, and were converted for the use of the Immaculate Conception Church, founded in 1855, as a sanctuary and Clergy House.

The buildings were designated a New York City landmark in 1966, and were added to the National Register of Historic Places in 1980.

References
Notes

External links

Roman Catholic churches in Manhattan
Properties of religious function on the National Register of Historic Places in Manhattan
Roman Catholic churches completed in 1896
19th-century Episcopal church buildings
Buildings converted to Catholic church buildings
Former Episcopal church buildings in New York City
East Village, Manhattan
Churches on the National Register of Historic Places in New York (state)
14th Street (Manhattan)
19th-century Roman Catholic church buildings in the United States